The 2021–22 Russian Cup was the 30th season of the Russian football knockout tournament since the dissolution of the Soviet Union.
The competition qualification started on 14 July 2021 and it concluded on 29 May 2022. The final was attended by almost 70,000 fans at the Luzhniki Stadium.

The winner of the cup would normally win entry into the 2022–23 UEFA Europa League; however, on 28 February 2022, Russian football clubs were suspended from FIFA & UEFA international competitions until further notice. The Russian invasion of Ukraine was cited as the reason. Nevertheless, the winners do qualify for the 2022 Russian Super Cup.

Round dates
The schedule of the competition is as follows.

Teams

Qualifying round

Round 1

Round 2

Round 3

Elite group round (1/32 and 1/16 finals) 
At this stage, 11 RPL teams enter the tournament, not playing in European competition. They are joined by 11 FNL teams and 11 PFL teams, winners of the last stage of the cup. The selection takes place in 11 groups. Each group contains one team from RPL, FNL and PFL.

The group stage will be held in 3 rounds. Teams from the lower leagues will play matches at home:
 1st round. August 25–26. PFL v FNL.
 2nd round. September 22–23. PFL v RPL.
 3rd round. October 27. FNL v RPL.

The system of scoring and determining the winners in the group round based on the results of each match:
 for winning in regulation time - 3 points.
 for a draw in regulation time and a victory on penalties - 2 points.
 for a draw in regulation time and defeat on penalties - 1 point.
 points are not awarded for a defeat in regular time.

Group 1

Group 2

Group 3

Group 4

Group 5

Group 6

Group 7

Group 8

Group 9

Group 10

Group 11

Knockout phase

Round of 16

Quarter-finals
The draw was held on 4 March 2022 in 16:00 MSK (UTC+3) live on russian sports channel «Match TV» and media portal «Sportbox.ru».

Rules for the draw:
 Each team able to play against each team;
 If the team played their last game (round of 16) at home, in quarter-final stage the game will be played at away;
 If the 2 teams on round of 16 played their game at home (or away), in quarter-final «home team» was determined by first team that was ball out.
On 30 March make available dates of the matches.

Semi-finals
The draw will be held on 21 April 2022 in 21:00 MSK (UTC+3) live on russian sports channel «Match TV» and media portal «Sportbox.ru».

Final

References

External links
 Official page

Russian Cup seasons
Cup
Russian Cup